Noreen Kershaw is an English television actress and director.

She trained at the Manchester Polytechnic School of Theatre and, at Liverpool's Everyman Theatre, originated the title role of the play Shirley Valentine,  later made famous by Pauline Collins. She was seen in the BBC television series Life on Mars, as WPC Phyllis Dobbs, the desk officer.

She had previously played the roles of Kathy Roach in Channel 4's Brookside 1988–1990, Lynne Harrison in Granada Television's Albion Market 1985–1986, and Joyce Wilson in the long running Granada TV sitcom, Watching.

She has directed episodes of the top rated ITV1 soap opera, Coronation Street, as well as Channel 4's comedy drama, Shameless, ITV1 soap opera Emmerdale and Heartbeat and BBC Scotland"s River City.

In 2008, she directed the feature film Act of Grace.

In 2022 she was a director of the ITV police procedural drama Ridley.

She is a fan of Bury AFC (previously Bury FC.)

References

External links

Alumni of Manchester Metropolitan University
1950 births
English television actresses
Living people
English television directors
People from Bury, Greater Manchester
British women television directors